WAIL (99.5 FM) is a radio station broadcasting a classic rock format. Licensed to Key West, Florida, United States, the station serves the Florida Keys area.  The station is currently owned by Robert Holladay, through licensee Florida Keys Media, LLC.

History
On January 25, 2008, it was announced that WAIL-FM was one of several Clear Channel radio stations to be sold, in order to remain under the ownership caps following the sale of Clear Channel to private investors. Until it was sold, WAIL and other stations to be sold were placed into the Aloha Stations Trust.

WAIL used to be known as "99.5 The Whale." WAIL simulcasted with WFKZ, and the two stations were formally known as "99.5/103.1 Sun FM."

The trust sold WAIL and three sister stations to Robert Holladay's Florida Keys Media, LLC for $650,000; the transaction was consummated on February 28, 2014.

WAIL simulcasts on WFKZ during the Hoebee In The Afternoon Experiment, M-W 2–6, TH2-7 and Fri 2–6.  They also air the same Saturday night programming, The Night Train With Joey Naples.

References

External links

AIL
Classic rock radio stations in the United States
Radio stations established in 1965
1965 establishments in Florida